Cholpon is a village and the administrative centre of Cholpon rural community in Kochkor District of Naryn Region of Kyrgyzstan. Its population was 3,020 in 2021.

References
 

Populated places in Naryn Region